Azizur Rahman (10 October 1939 – 14 March 2022) was a Bangladeshi film director. His directorial debut was the 1967 film, Saiful Mulk Badiuzzamal. During his career, he directed 53 films in total. His notable films include Chhutir Ghonta (1980) and Ashikkhito (1978).

Personal life
On 14 March 2022, Rahman died of a heart attack at  Lakeridge Health Ajax Pickering Hospital in Toronto, Canada. Earlier, due to illness, he was treated in a hospital in Canada for a year.

Films 
 Saiful Mulk Badiuzzamal (1967)
 Madhumala (1968)
 Shikriti (1972)
 Somadhan (1972)
 Atithi (1973)
 Porichoy (1974)
 Oporadh (1975)
 Garmil (1976)
 Shapmukti (1976)
 Taal Betal (1976)
 Kuwasha (1977)
 Amor Prem (1977)
 Anubhab (1977)
 Ashikkhito (1978)
 Agnishikha (1978)
 Matir Ghar (1979)
 Pran Sajani (1979)
 Chhutir Ghonta (1980)
 Shesh Uttor (1980)
 Sonar Tori (1981)
 Mohanagar (1981)
 Sampanwala
 Rangin Rupban
 Pratidan
 Janata Express (1981)
 Jontor Montor (1982)
 Mehman (1983)
 Mayer Achol (1984)
 Ali Baba Chalish Chor (1988)
 Sheesh Mahal (1991)
 Swashur Bari (1991)
 Bap Beta 420 (1991)
 Dil (1992)
 Zid (1993)
 Lozza (1995)
 Ghore Ghore Juddho (1997)
 Kotha Dao (1997)
 Doctor Bari (2007)
 Dukkhini Johora (2007)
 Jomidar Barir Meye (2008)
 Mati (2016)

References

External links
 

1939 births
2022 deaths
Bangladeshi film directors
Bangladeshi screenwriters
People from Bogra District